Segnette Field is a 750-seat baseball stadium located in the New Orleans metropolitan area town of Westwego, Louisiana. The stadium includes a grandstand, press box, public address system and scoreboard. The baseball field features artificial turf with a clay pitcher's mound. The stadium opened in May 2002.

It is the current home of the Loyola Wolf Pack baseball team. College baseball, LHSAA high school baseball games and American Legion baseball games are played at the stadium.  The stadium is also used for festivals.

References

External links
 Loyola Wolf Pack baseball

Baseball venues in New Orleans
College baseball venues in the United States
Loyola Wolf Pack baseball
High school baseball venues in the United States
Sports venues completed in 2002
2002 establishments in Louisiana